Tight Shoes is a 1941 American comedy film directed by Albert S. Rogell and starring Leo Carrillo, John Howard, and Broderick Crawford. It is based on the Damon Runyon story.

Plot
Shoe store owner Amalfi (Leo Carrillo) is forced by crook Speedy Miller (Broderick Crawford) to allow the business to be a front for illegal gambling. Miller works for a crime boss Horace Grover "the Brain" (Samuel S. Hinds), managing editor of a newspaper.  Jimmy Rupert (John Howard) is a clerk in the store and sells a pair of shoes to Miller that are too small and hurt his feet. Distracted by his pinched feet in the "tight shoes", Miller places a losing bet on the horse named Feet First.

A fight ensues with his girlfriend Sybil Ash (Binnie Barnes) and she leaves him.  He blames his loss on Rupert and gets him fired from the shoe store. In response, Rupert complains about crooked politicians who allow crime to flourish, and successfully runs for office. He is opposed by the newspaper, but supported by Miller's ex-girlfriend Sybil Ash. On the day he wins the election, Rupert and Ash are engaged to be married. Amalfi ends up hiring Miller as a clerk in his store. On the wedding day, Miller sends a pair of "tight shoes" to Rupert as a wedding gift.

Cast
Leo Carrillo as Amalfi
John Howard as Jimmy Rupert
Broderick Crawford as Speedy Miller
Edward Gargan as Blooch
Binnie Barnes as Sybil Ash
Anne Gwynne as Ruth
Samuel S. Hinds as Horace Grover, 'the Brain' 
Shemp Howard as Okay
Robert Emmett O'Connor as Honest John Beebe
Richard Lane as Allan McGrath
Sarah Padden as Mrs. Rupert

References

External links
 
 
 
 

1941 films
1940s English-language films
1941 comedy films
American black-and-white films
American comedy films
Films directed by Albert S. Rogell
Universal Pictures films
1940s American films